Olympique Batna is an Algerian basketball club based in Batna. Established in 1972, the team plays in the Algerian Basketball Championship.

History
The team was founded by Brahim Yezza, Khomri Miloud and Kaouli Chérif in 1972.

Notable players

 Mamadou Faye

References

Basketball teams in Algeria
Basketball teams established in 1972